Danylo Ihorovych Ihnatenko (born 13 March 1997) is a Ukrainian professional footballer who plays as a midfielder for  club Bordeaux and the Ukraine national team.

Club career
Ihnatenko is product of the Metalurh Zaporizhzhia youth team system. His first trainer was Mykola Syenovalov.

He made his debut for Metalurh Zaporizhzhia in the Ukrainian Premier League in a match against Dynamo Kyiv on 30 May 2015.

On 16 June 2020, Ihnatenko became champion with Ferencváros by beating Budapest Honvéd at the Hidegkuti Nándor Stadion on the 30th match day of the 2019–20 Nemzeti Bajnokság I season.

International career 
Ihnatenko made his debut for Ukraine in a 1–0 UEFA Nations League win over the Republic of Ireland on 8 June 2022.

Career statistics

Club

International

International goals

Honours
Ferencváros
 Nemzeti Bajnokság I: 2019–20

References

External links
 
 
 

1997 births
Living people
Footballers from Zaporizhzhia
Ukrainian footballers
Association football midfielders
Ukraine under-21 international footballers
Ukraine international footballers
Ukrainian Premier League players
Nemzeti Bajnokság I players
Ligue 1 players
Ligue 2 players
FC Metalurh Zaporizhzhia players
FC Shakhtar Donetsk players
FC Mariupol players
Ferencvárosi TC footballers
SC Dnipro-1 players
FC Girondins de Bordeaux players
Ukrainian expatriate footballers
Expatriate footballers in Hungary
Ukrainian expatriate sportspeople in Hungary
Expatriate footballers in France
Ukrainian expatriate sportspeople in France